David McKinney was a prominent Presbyterian pastor, theologian, and publisher in Pennsylvania.

He graduated from Jefferson College (now Washington & Jefferson College) in 1821.  In addition to his pastoral and professorial duties, he founded The Presbyterian Banner in 1852 in Philadelphia. He merged that publication with the Pittsburgh-based Presbyterian Advocate before selling the publication in 1864. By 1906, it was considered the oldest religious magazine in the country.

References

Washington & Jefferson College alumni
Princeton Theological Seminary alumni
1752 births
1795 deaths